Minffordd Hospital was a health facility in Bangor, Gwynedd, Wales. It was managed by the Betsi Cadwaladr University Health Board.

History
The facility was established on a part of the Penrhyn Estate as an isolation hospital in 1895. An additional hospital wing was added in 1937 and, after joining the National Health Service in 1948, it served as a convalescent home. After services had transferred to Ysbyty Gwynedd, it closed in 1984 but then re-opened as a mental health facility in 1988. It finally closed completely in 2006 and Gwynedd Council approved demolition of the deteriorating buildings in August 2019.

References

Hospitals in Gwynedd
Hospitals established in 1895
1895 establishments in Wales
Hospital buildings completed in 1895
Defunct hospitals in Wales